Storsteinnes Chapel is a parish church of the Church of Norway in Balsfjord Municipality in Troms og Finnmark county, Norway. It is located on the south side of the village of Storsteinnes. It is one of the churches for the Balsfjord parish which is part of the Senja prosti (deanery) in the Diocese of Nord-Hålogaland. The white, wooden church was built in a long church style in 1968. The church seats about 200 people.

See also
List of churches in Nord-Hålogaland

References

Balsfjord
Churches in Troms
Wooden churches in Norway
20th-century Church of Norway church buildings
Churches completed in 1968
1968 establishments in Norway
Long churches in Norway